Julio César Clement (born Santa Fe, 1 July 1962) is a former Argentine rugby union player and coach. He played as a hooker.

Career
Always playing for Club Universitario de Santa Fe, Clement, playing as hooker, played also two matches for Argentina, being the only from his city to have played for the Pumas; these two international matches, against Uruguay and Brazil, made possible for Clement to win the South America Rugby Championship in 1987 and 1989.
After his playing career, his coaching career and political career followed: As coach, he is present in the coaching staff of his club of origin, Universitario, as forwards coach, while as politician, he is Sports subsecretary  and coordinator of the Santa Fe Province.

Notes

External links
Julio Clement international stats

1962 births
Living people
Sportspeople from Santa Fe Province
Argentine rugby union players
Argentine rugby union coaches
Rugby union hookers
Argentina international rugby union players